Edwin Stephenson may refer to:

 Ned Stephenson (1832–1898), English cricketer
 Edwin Stephenson (organist) (1871–1922), English cathedral organist